The South Laclo River ( or) is a river in the Manufahi municipality of East Timor. It flows southwards, and then southeastwards, into the Timor Sea.

Etymology
English language sources conventionally refer to the river as the South Laclo River, as there is also another Laclo River, usually referred to in English as the North Laclo River, which discharges into Wetar Strait on the north coast of East Timor. 

The two rivers are not connected to each other; both rise in the uplands near Turiscai in Manufahi municipality, where a drainage divide causes them to flow southwards and northwards, respectively, in each case later augmented by several tributaries.

Course

In order of entrance, the river's main tributaries are as follows:

 Limetain River: rises in Suco Matorec northeast of Oroluli; flows generally south southeastwards to just east of Lagoa Laheborak, where it merges with a stream discharging from that lake to form the Ahangcain River (see below).

 Ahangcain River: flows from the confluence of the Limetain River and the stream discharging from Lagoa Laheborak southeastwards to the border between Turiscai and Fatuberlio administrative posts, near which it becomes the South Laclo River.

 Clere or Clerec River: a branch of this river enters the South Laclo River a short distance north of the latter's mouth; the rest of it flows into swampy marshland that includes several lagoons.

Catchment
Its main population centre is the town of Alas in central Manufahi.

East Timor has been broadly divided into twelve 'hydrologic units', groupings of climatologically and physiographically similar and adjacent river catchments.

Economy

In and prior to the 1940s, there was gold exploration on the banks of the river. An academic paper published in 2014 asserted that there were prospects of finding gold placer in the sandy gravel strata in the South Laclo and two other rivers in the Turiscai administrative post, and, more importantly, of finding primary gold deposits in those rivers' upper reaches.

See also
 List of rivers of East Timor

References

External links

Manufahi Municipality
Rivers of East Timor